Stanton is a city in the U.S. state of Michigan.  The population was 1,417 at the 2010 census.  It is the county seat of Montcalm County. It is located at the corners of four townships and incorporates land from each: Day Township to the northeast, Evergreen Township to the southeast, Sidney Township to the southwest, and Douglass Township to the northwest.

History
Stanton was organized in 1860 when the people of Montcalm County voted to move the county seat here from Greenville, which was the original county seat from 1840. At that time, the County Board purchased  from Fred Hall of Ionia and named the city "Fred" in his honor. The family of Levi Camburn was the first to settle here and he became its first postmaster on March 10, 1862. The city was renamed for Secretary of War, Edwin M. Stanton in 1863.  Stanton was platted in 1865, incorporated as a village in 1869, and as a city in 1881. The Hotel Montcalm was established in 1863.

Geography

The Stanton post office, with ZIP code 48888, also serves portions of the four surrounding townships: Day Township to the northeast, Evergreen Township to the southeast, Sidney Township to the southwest, and Douglass Township to the northwest, as well as areas of Ferris Township to the east of Day, Belvidere Township to the north of Douglass, and Pine Township to the west of Douglass.

Transportation

Demographics

2010 census
As of the census of 2010, there were 1,417 people, 508 households, and 315 families living in the city. The racial makeup of the city was 93.8% White, 1.8% African American, 0.7% Native American, 0.2% Asian, 1.8% from other races, and 1.7% from two or more races. Hispanic or Latino of any race were 5.9% of the population.

There were 508 households, of which 32.7% had children under the age of 18 living with them, 39.6% were married couples living together, 17.9% had a female householder with no husband present, 4.5% had a male householder with no wife present, and 38.0% were non-families. 33.3% of all households were made up of individuals, and 16.3% had someone living alone who was 65 years of age or older. The average household size was 2.42 and the average family size was 3.01.

The median age in the city was 33.8 years. 23.9% of residents were under the age of 18; 11.6% were between the ages of 18 and 24; 29.5% were from 25 to 44; 21.3% were from 45 to 64; and 13.8% were 65 years of age or older. The gender makeup of the city was 50.6% male and 49.4% female.

2000 census
As of the census of 2000, there were 1,504 people, 555 households, and 362 families living in the city. The racial makeup of the city was 95.94% White, 0.20% African American, 0.40% Native American, 0.27% Asian, 1.13% from other races, and 2.06% from two or more races. Hispanic or Latino of any race were 4.85% of the population. 46.9% of the town was Finnish, the largest percentage of any populated place in the United States.

There were 555 households, out of which 37.3% had children under the age of 18 living with them, 42.7% were married couples living together, 17.1% had a female householder with no husband present, and 34.6% were non-families. 29.7% of all households were made up of individuals, and 14.6% had someone living alone who was 65 years of age or older.  The average household size was 2.54 and the average family size was 3.13.

In the city, the population was spread out, with 29.9% under the age of 18, 9.0% from 18 to 24, 31.9% from 25 to 44, 16.9% from 45 to 64, and 12.2% who were 65 years of age or older.  The median age was 32 years. For every 100 females, there were 96.1 males.  For every 100 females age 18 and over, there were 92.3 males.

The median income for a household in the city was $29,286, and the median income for a family was $39,688. Males had a median income of $32,569 versus $22,500 for females. The per capita income for the city was $13,901.  About 17.8% of families and 21.7% of the population were below the poverty line, including 30.3% of those under age 18 and 12.2% of those age 65 or over.

Points of interest
 Mid Michigan Motorplex
Corporate Home to Casair, Inc.

References

Cities in Montcalm County, Michigan
County seats in Michigan
Finnish-American culture in Michigan
1860 establishments in Michigan